Familie (Dutch for Family) is a Flemish television soap opera set in Mechelen. Created by Herman Verbaet, Familie was first broadcast on 30 December 1991. It has been broadcast consistently for 5-6 evenings per week, with only 2-3 month hiatuses during summer. It is currently being produced by Banijay Belgium and running on VTM.

Premise 
Pierre Van den Bossche and Anna Dierckx have raised three children. Their oldest son Guido is a bright student, eager to become a business mogul. His younger brother Jan and sister Rita are less gifted and often feel pushed back, but are nevertheless proud of their sibling. Once the children are starting their own family lives, shocking news arrives: Anna is pregnant again and Pierre has been diagnosed with a terminal disease. Pierre dies weeks before the birth of his daughter Marleen. Anna is devastated, but decides to stay strong.

Start of the series 
Anna still mourns her deceased husband Pierre, but as she is turning 65 years old she is also happy to see her children are all doing well. Marleen is now a young adult studying at a fashion academy. Guido has successfully founded the VDB Systems electronics company, is married to the eccentric Marie-Rose De Putter and has two children: Peter and Veronique. Jan also works for the company and married to Monique Stevens, he also has two children: Bart and Mieke. Rita has been struggling due to the death of her first son Paul, the illness of her second son Pierrot and the ongoing rivalry with her sister-in-law Marie-Rose, but manages to find happiness in her singing career and her husband Dirk Cockelaere.

Development of the main characters 
Marleen marries school teacher Ben Van der Venne. When she turns out to be infertile, the couple enters a long adoption procedure. On the day little Lovely finally arrives, fate strikes as Marleen gets fatally hit by a car while crossing the street. Ben has a hard time raising Lovely as a single father, but gets close help of Anna and her new live companion Albert. Eventually, Ben signs on for a development project in Africa and takes Lovely with him, after which contact fades. Years later, grown up Lovely comes to spend a couple of years in Belgium and tells her family that Ben has died.

After losing another child, Rita starts suffering a severe alcohol addiction. Dirk leaves her while she is pregnant of their third child, causing Rita to have a mental breakdown and trying to murder Guido and Marie-Rose. Rita ends up in prison, where she gives birth to another son, which she calls Pierrot again. After being released, she marries fellow alcoholic Rob Gerrits, yet both help each other to get their lives back on track. The family embraces her again and keeps a close eye on her, but cannot prevent her from a handful returns to drinking, such as the one following her divorce from Rob. She eventually revives her music career by signing on as a singer and animator on sea cruises. Pierrot grows up to be a very socially committed young man. After a failed career as a street worker, he moves to South America as a development aid.

Guido is still a successful and well-respected businessman, but his personal life takes quite a few hits, such as his divorce from the adulterous Marie-Rose and the alleged death of their son Peter. Guido survives multiple murder attempts by his professional enemy Didier De Kunst, yet one of those makes him end up in a wheelchair for many years to follow. Luck seems to get back to his side when Peter turns out to be alive, but shortly after this joyful event, Guido dies following a stabbing incident. Peter rises as his father's successor, while Veronique establishes a fashion company. Years after, the two companies merge into a holding in which both siblings maintain management positions. Workaholic Veronique is having a troubled relationship with her son Cedric, who blames her for having neglected him his whole life. Peter's daughter Louise leaves for a sabbatical in Australia before deciding how to start adulthood. Both Peter and Veronique have been married several times. Peter is currently single, while Veronique is dating the holding's current CEO Lars De Wulf.

Jan gets married two more times, with Nele Van Winckel and Linda Desmedt, which leads to three more children: Maarten, Leen and Guido Jr, the latter named after Jan's deceased brother. His professional life highlights when he gets appointed mayor, yet after his return to VDB he keeps getting downgraded until he decides to quit and take over the local café. Bart becomes an engineer and has a long run at VDB, while marrying Brenda Vermeir and getting two children: Hannah, who grows up to be a fashion designer for VDB, and Jelle, who wants to become a professional soccer player. After Brenda dies in a car accident, Bart starts a relationship with Peter's ex-wife Trudy Tack de Rixart de Waremme. The couple moves to Dubai, where Bart is pursuing a new career. Mieke spends her first years of adulthood doing development aid in Africa and South America. Back in Belgium, she marries Marc De Waele and gets a son Lennert, but father and son eventually die in a car crash. During her next marriage with Wim Veugelen, she has a miscarriage and becomes infertile. When she starts working as a nurse in the local hospital, she has an affair with one of the doctors, leading to her divorce. Eventually she enters a surprising but successful marriage with the younger Niko Schuurmans. After an accident, she suffers a change in personality, leading her to quit welfare and start a business career at VDB. Maarten becomes a chef and gets his own restaurant, managed by VDB. After the death of his girlfriend Roos, he joins a development program in Asia. Leen becomes a doctor and works in the local hospital for a while, after which she decides to become a general practitioner. A medical suspension after having committed a flight crime, leads her to join a development program in Africa. She takes her son Arthur and boyfriend Faroud Kir with her. Guido Jr becomes a car mechanic and owns a garage together with one of his former classmates. He and his girlfriend Emma Verdonck get a daughter Mila. Later on, it is revealed that she was switched with another child right after birth, and that a girl named Milou is their real daughter. Guido and Emma meet the girl's father and they agree to co-parent.

Current main cast

Current supporting cast

Former main cast

Notes

References

External links 

 
 

1991 Belgian television series debuts
Belgian drama television shows
Flemish television shows
Television shows set in Belgium
VTM (TV channel) original programming